Cassiglio is a comune (municipality) in the Province of Bergamo in the northern Italian region of Lombardy, located about  northeast of Milan and about  north of Bergamo.

Cassiglio borders the following municipalities: Camerata Cornello, Cusio, Olmo al Brembo, Ornica, Piazza Brembana, Santa Brigida, Taleggio, Valtorta, Vedeseta.

References